Lakly (Laqlı) is a rural locality (a selo) and the administrative centre of Laklinsky Selsoviet, Salavatsky District, Bashkortostan, Russia. The population was 925 as of 2010. There are 10 streets.

Geography 
Lakly is located 31 km east of Maloyaz (the district's administrative centre) by road. Yelanlino is the nearest rural locality.

References 

Rural localities in Salavatsky District